Typhloplanidae is a family of flatworms in the order Rhabdocoela.

It is one of the most species-rich families of Rhabdocoela, comprising around 300 species. They inhabit freshwater, estuarine, marine and terrestrial habitats. They can be benthic or pelagic. Typhloplanidae are predatory. They can reach high densities in their habitats. Most representatives are 1 to 5 mm in length, but a few species, like Mesostoma ehrenbergii, can reach up to 1.5 cm.

Subfamilies and genera (incomplete):

 Subfamily Ascophorinae Findenegg, 1924
 Subfamily Mesophaenocorinae Norena, Brusa, Ponce de Leon & Damborenea, 2005
 Subfamily Mesostominae Hyman, 1955
 Genus Bothromesostoma Braun, 1885
 Genus Mesostoma Ehrenberg, 1837
 Subfamily Olisthanellinae Luther, 1904
 Subfamily Opistominae Luther, 1963
 Genus Opistomum Schmidt, 1848
 Subfamily Phaenocorinae Wahl, 1910
 Subfamily Protoplanellinae Reisinger, 1924
 Subfamily Rhynchomesostominae Bresslau, 1933
 Genus Rhynchomesostoma Luther, 1904
 Subfamily Typhloplaninae Luther, 1904

References

Platyhelminthes families
Rhabdocoela